Dorcadion shushense is a species of beetle in the family Cerambycidae. It was described by Lazarev in 2010.

References

shushense
Beetles described in 2010